Nygränd is an alley in Gamla stan, the old town of Stockholm, Sweden, connecting Skeppsbron to Österlånggatan.

 Old names  Niia grenden (1553), Nygrenden (1570)
Until the early 1520s, a fish market (Fisketorget, "The Fisherman's Square") was located between the site of the present alley and the alley south of it, Brunnsgränd, the square at the time forming a natural continuation to Köpmangatan ("The Merchant's Street"), the street leading east from the central square Stortorget.

One of the old town's most elaborate portals is found on 2, Nygränd.

 Parallel streets  Kråkgränd, Brunnsgränd
 Crossing streets  Skeppsbron, Österlånggatan

References

See also 

 List of streets and squares in Gamla stan

Streets in Stockholm